Marius George Țucudean (born 30 April 1991) is a Romanian former professional footballer who played as a striker.

He made his senior debut with UTA Arad in 2009, and throughout his career represented among others Dinamo București, FCSB, Viitorul Constanța and CFR Cluj, winning a combined ten domestic trophies. Țucudean also had two unsuccessful spells abroad, with Standard Liège and Charlton Athletic respectively. With CFR Cluj, he was the top scorer of the Romanian first division in the 2017–18 and 2018–19 seasons, and was named the Romanian Footballer of the Year for 2018 by the Gazeta Sporturilor newspaper.

Țucudean made his first appearance for the Romania national team in November 2017, and scored his first goal for the country the following year in a 2–1 victory over Israel.

Club career

UTA Arad
Țucudean started his career playing for hometown club UTA Arad. He stayed with UTA for two years before joining Liga I team Dinamo București.

Dinamo București

He made his debut for Dinamo București on 1 April 2011 in a game against Universitatea Cluj. Țucudean made an immediate impact at the capital-based club, scoring four goals from 13 appearances in the second half of the 2010–11 season. In the following campaign he made 30 appearances and scored four goals, also recording his UEFA Europa League debut.

On 14 July 2012, Țucudean netted twice against CFR Cluj in the Supercupa României, with Dinamo eventually winning the trophy at the penalty shoot-out. He was named man of the match for his performance. Fifteen days later, Țucudean scored four goals and offered an assist in the opener of the 2012–13 Liga I against CSMS Iași.

Standard Liège
On 31 January 2013, Țucudean agreed to a four-and-a-half-year contract with Belgian side Standard Liège, where he was wanted by coach Mircea Rednic and was teammate with fellow Romanian Adrian Cristea. After failing to score a goal in eleven league games, in the summer of the same year he rejoined Dinamo București on a season-long loan.

Charlton Athletic
Țucudean signed a three-year deal with English club Charlton Athletic in July 2014. On 19 August, he scored his first goal in a 3–2 win over Derby County. His second goal came in a 2–1 victory against Bolton Wanderers on 21 October, a game in which he also assisted Johnnie Jackson's winner.

On 28 January 2015, he was loaned out with an option to buy to FCSB, the cross-town rival of his former team Dinamo. During his spell with the Roș-albaștrii, he won the Liga I, the Cupa României and the newly formed Cupa Ligii. He returned to Charlton in September, but in January the following year Țucudean again left on loan to join ASA Târgu Mureș. His contract with Charlton was terminated on 1 July 2016.

Viitorul Constanța
On 22 March 2017, Țucudean signed with Viitorul Constanța.

CFR Cluj
Țucudean was transferred to CFR Cluj for an undisclosed fee on 8 January 2018. He ended the 2017–18 season as the top scorer of the league championship, a position he shared with FCSB striker Harlem Gnohéré.

Following his good display throughout the year, in late November Țucudean was nominated for Gazeta Sporturilors 2018 Romanian Footballer of the Year award. On 21 December, he was announced as the winner of the trophy. Shortly after the start of the 2019–20 season, Țucudean temporarily retired from football in order to fully recover after undergoing two heart surgeries earlier in the year.

International career
Țucudean is a former Romania under-17 and under-19 international, having played 3 and 5 games respectively. He scored three goals for the under-21 side as well.

He scored his first goal for the senior team in a 2–1 victory over Israel, on 24 March 2018.

Personal life
Țucudean is part of a wealthy family, their fortune being estimated by Romanian press at figures between €80 million and €100 million. His father Marius was also a footballer who played as a striker for UTA Arad, but retired at age 27 after being diagnosed with a heart disorder.

Career statistics

Club

International

International goals
 (Romania score listed first, score column indicates score after each Țucudean goal)

HonoursDinamo BucureștiCupa României: 2011–12
Supercupa României: 2012FCSBLiga I: 2014–15
Cupa României: 2014–15
Supercupa României runner-up: 2015
Cupa Ligii: 2014–15Viitorul ConstanțaLiga I: 2016–17
Supercupa României runner-up: 2017CFR ClujLiga I: 2017–18, 2018–19, 2019–20
Supercupa României: 2018Individual'''Gazeta Sporturilor'' Romanian Footballer of the Year: 2018
Liga I top scorer: 2017–18, 2018–19

References

External links

1991 births
Living people
Sportspeople from Arad, Romania
Association football forwards
Romanian footballers
Romania youth international footballers
Romania under-21 international footballers
Romania international footballers
Liga I players
Liga II players
Belgian Pro League players
English Football League players
FC UTA Arad players
FC Dinamo București players
Standard Liège players
Charlton Athletic F.C. players
FC Steaua București players
FC Viitorul Constanța players
ASA 2013 Târgu Mureș players
CS Pandurii Târgu Jiu players
CFR Cluj players
Romanian expatriate footballers
Expatriate footballers in Belgium
Expatriate footballers in England
Romanian expatriate sportspeople in Belgium
Romanian expatriate sportspeople in England